Vehicle registration plates of Mexico are issued with unique visual designs by each state, but with a single national numbering system, such that serials are not duplicated in multiple states. Most states change designs approximately every three years, with each state having its own plate replacement cycle. Every year, owners of Mexican-registered vehicles pay the tenencia or revalidación de placas (car plates renewal tax). A set of Mexican plates includes one pair of plates, a windshield sticker, and in some states a plate sticker. The international code for Mexico is "MEX".

Development
In 2001 the size of the plate number was reduced in order to accommodate the addition of the state number, legend indicating the position of the plate on the vehicle (delantera (front) or trasera (rear)), and additional graphics.

Mexican plates are issued in several different classifications: Private, Private Fronteriza, Public, Public Frontera, Servicio Público Federal, Inspección Fiscal y Aduanera, Armada de México, and Secretaría de Relaciones Exteriores. The Fronteriza plates were introduced in 1972 and are available in the Mexico–United States border zone. This zone is formed by the states of Baja California and Baja California Sur, as well as parts of Sonora, Chihuahua, Coahuila and Tamaulipas. While the state of Nuevo León shares a  border with the U.S., it does not have any cities within the border zone.

As of 24 June 2016, the combinations issued had to be changed as no combinations may be repeated. From having used ABC-12-34, several jurisdictions began changing to ABC-123-A for private vehicles, A-123-ABC for public vehicles. Mexico City changed privately owned vehicles at the same time; they are now A12-ABC.

Plate types

Private, non-border zone

Public, non-border zone

Private, border zone

Public, border zone

Public Federal Service (SPF)

Seguridad Pública (Local, State or Federal Police and related)

Current series for Mexico City 
The current 000-AAA plate series for Mexico City (until 2016 the Distrito Federal) was introduced in 1972, allowing registration for 10,950,300 private automobiles. This series was not affected by plate designs, and continued to be used until its ending in early 2015 (999-ZZZ). However, in 2001 all vehicles using combinations around 000-LWU and older received all-new combinations beginning with 000-MAA. Following the established series, vehicles after 999-ZZZ are registered as A01-AAA, in order not to use a combination used in the past, Letters I, O and Q are not used.

000-LAA for late 2000 and 2001 (plate redesign and full registration renewal around 000-LWU)
000-MAA, 000-NAA and 000-PAA were issued as replacement for older combinations and a few new registrations in 2003.
000-RAA for late 2001 and 2002 new registrations
000-SAA for late 2002 and 2004
000-TAA for late 2003 and 2006
000-UAA for 2006 and 2007
000-VAA for 2007 and early 2008 (plate redesign around 155-VSV and 865-VSV)
000-WAA for 2008 and 2009
000-XAA for 2010 and 2011
000-YAA for 2012 and 2013 (plate redesign after 999-YVT)
000-ZAA for 2013 and 2014
A00-AAA for 2015 and 2018
A00-BAA for 2018 onwards

References

External links

Mexico
Road transportation in Mexico
Mexico transportation-related lists
 Registration plates